Tingis (Latin;  Tíngis) or Tingi (Ancient Berber:), the ancient name of Tangier in Morocco, was an important Carthaginian, Moor, and Roman port on the Atlantic Ocean. It was eventually granted the status of a Roman colony and made the capital of the province of Mauretania Tingitana and, after Diocletian's reforms, the diocese of Hispania.

Legends

The Greeks claimed that Tingis had been named for a daughter of the titan Atlas, who was supposed to support the vault of heaven nearby. They claimed that the Berber legends comported with the stories of Hercules's labors, which carried him to North Africa and the North Atlantic to retrieve the golden apples of the Hesperides. Having killed her husband Antaeus and again condemned her father to eternally supporting the firmament, Hercules slept with Tinja and fathered the Berber hero Syphax. Syphax supposedly founded the port of Tingis and named it his mother's honor after her death. The gigantic skeleton and tomb of Antaeus were tourist attractions for ancient visitors. The Caves of Hercules, where he supposedly rested on Cape Spartel, remain one today.

History

Punic port
The town is sometimes connected to the voyages of Hanno the Navigator.

Mauretanian city
After the Punic Wars, Carthage lost control of the colony to the Roman-allied kings of Mauretania. Its name during this time appears in Greek and Roman sources variously as Tenga, Tinga, Titga, &c. It maintained strong ties to its Carthaginian heritage, issuing bronze coins with Punic legends reading "City of Titga", "City of Tinga", or "people of Tinga". These bore Baal or (via interpretatio Graeca) Demeter's head obverse and wheat reverse.

Roman provincial capital

The town came under Roman rule in the 1st centuryBC. Q.Sertorius, took and held Tingis for a number of years in the 70sBC as part of his war against Sulla's regime in Rome. Tingis grew in importance as a free city under Augustus and then as a colony under Claudius, who made it the capital of Mauritania Tingitana. As a Roman colony, it bore the formal name , the "Julian colony of Tingis". Under the early empire, it began to use Latin script, issuing its bronze coins with the legend ; these bore Augustus and Agrippa's heads obverse and Baal's head reverse.

As a provincial capital, Tingis developed and prospered. In the 4th century, it surpassed Volubilis when that city was left south of the Roman lines and unprotected by Roman legions. Tingis at its peak reached 20,000 inhabitants, all thoroughly romanized and mostly Christian. Tingis was famed throughout the Roman Empire for its fishing conserve industry. Under Septimius Severus, two Roman roads were constructed from Tingis: one on the Atlantic coast to Sala Colonia and the second into the mountainous interior toward Volubilis.

During Diocletian's reform of Roman governmental structures in AD296, Mauretania Tingitana became part of the Diocese of Hispania. Tingis remained the capital of the larger territory, maintaining its status and development.

Later history

The Vandals conquered and occupied Tingis around AD425 before sweeping across the Roman Maghreb.

Between 534 and 682, Tingis was restored to Byzantine control. Tingis was fortified and a new church erected. However, its commercial strength had waned, a change attested by its decreased issuance of coins.

Tingis fell under the control of the Umayyad Caliphate as part of the Muslim conquest of North Africa in 702, after which it was reduced to a small town more commonly discussed under the name Tangier. Moussa Ibn Noussair organized the conquest of Spain from Tingis and nearby Septem in 706.

Religion
The Christian history of Tingis started during the second half of the first century, under Claudius's rule. Originally, the city was part of the larger province of Mauretania Caesariensis, which included most of the Roman Maghreb. Later the area was subdivided, with the eastern part keeping the former name and the newer part receiving the name of Mauretania Tingitana. It is not known exactly at what period there may have been an episcopal see at Tangier in ancient times, but in the late Middle Ages Tangier was a titular see (i.e., an honorific fiction for the appointment of curial and auxiliary bishops). For the historical reasons given above, one official list of the Roman Curia places the see in Mauretania Caesariensis.

Towards the end of the third century, Tingis was the scene of the martyrdom of StMarcellus, mentioned in the Roman Martyrology on 30 October, and of St.Cassian, mentioned on 3 December. Indeed, according to tradition, the martyrdom of StMarcellus took place on 28 July 298. 

A small Christian community survived in Tangier as late as the 10th century. Due to its Christian past, Tangierunder the name Tingisis still a titular see of the Roman Catholic Church.

See also
 Mauretania Tingitana
 Sala Colonia
 Saints Cassian and Marcellus of Tingis
 Roman Empire

References

Citations

Bibliography
 . 
 .
 .
Rachid, Mueden. Las colonias y municipios de la Mauretania Tingitana (Tingis, Zilis, Lixus, Banasa, Thamusida, Sala, Volubilis) University of Sevilla. Sevilla, 2010. 
 .

Roman towns and cities in Morocco
Mauretania Tingitana
Phoenician colonies in Morocco
Roman towns and cities in Mauretania Tingitana